David Miller (30 January 1870 – 12 April 1943) was an Australian cricketer. He played first-class cricket for Auckland, New South Wales and Queensland between 1892 and 1906.

See also
 List of Auckland representative cricketers
 List of New South Wales representative cricketers

References

External links
 

1870 births
1943 deaths
Australian cricketers
Auckland cricketers
New South Wales cricketers
Queensland cricketers
Sportspeople from North Lanarkshire
Scottish emigrants to Australia